In the realm of electronic technology, ASIC stands for application-specific integrated circuit, an integrated circuit customized for a specific task.

ASIC may also refer to:
 Accreditation Service for International Colleges, an educational accreditation agency in the UK
 Acid-sensing ion channels, a protein family
 Air and Space Interoperability Council , former name of the Air Force Interoperability Council
 Arfoire Syndicate of International Crime, the antagonist group in the video game Hyperdimension Neptunia mk2
 ASIC programming language, a dialect of BASIC
 Associated Signature Containers (ASiC), specifies the use of container structures to bind together one or more signed objects with either advanced electronic signatures or time-stamp tokens into one single digital container
 Association Scientifique Internationale pour le Café, a scientific organization based in France
 Australian Securities & Investments Commission, Australia's corporate regulator
 Aviation Security Identification Card, an Australian identification card

See also
 Asics, an athletic equipment company